Jonathan Harvey (February 25, 1780 – August 23, 1859) was an American farmer and politician from New Hampshire. He served as a member of the United States House of Representatives and the New Hampshire House of Representatives in the early 1800s.

Early life
Born in Sutton, New Hampshire, Harvey was the son of Matthew and Hannah (Hadley) Harvey. He was the brother of Matthew Harvey, a United States federal judge. He attended the common schools before engaging in agricultural pursuits.

Career
He served as member of the New Hampshire House of Representatives from 1811 to 1816, 1831 to 1834, and 1838 to 1840. He served in the New Hampshire Senate from 1816 to 1823, and was president of the State Senate from 1817 to 1823. He was a member of the Executive Council of New Hampshire from 1823 to 1825.

Elected as a Jacksonian to the Nineteenth, Twentieth, and Twenty-first Congresses, Harvey served from March 4, 1825 to March 3, 1831.  He was not a candidate for renomination in 1830, and retired to his farm at North Sutton, New Hampshire.

Death
Harvey died on August 23, 1859 (age 79 years, 179 days) at North Sutton, New Hampshire. He is interred at North Sutton Cemetery in North Sutton, New Hampshire.

References

External links

 

1780 births
1859 deaths
New Hampshire state senators
People from Sutton, New Hampshire
Members of the New Hampshire House of Representatives
Members of the Executive Council of New Hampshire
Presidents of the New Hampshire Senate
Jacksonian members of the United States House of Representatives from New Hampshire
19th-century American politicians